Akhtubinka is a rural locality (a selo) in Khosheutovsky Selsoviet, Kharabalinsky District, Astrakhan Oblast, Russia. The population was 417 as of 2010. There are 5 streets.

Geography 
Akhtubinka is located on the Ashuluk River, 67 km southeast of Kharabali (the district's administrative centre) by road. Khosheutovo is the nearest rural locality.

References 

Rural localities in Kharabalinsky District